Dalton Gardens is a city in Kootenai County, Idaho, United States. It is considered a suburb of Coeur d'Alene and borders the city to the north and east. The city of Dalton Gardens is also part of the larger Spokane-Coeur d'Alene Combined Metropolitan Statistical Area which encompasses Kootenai County, Idaho. The population of Dalton Gardens was 2,335 at the time of the 2010 census.

Geography
Dalton Gardens is located at  (47.733397, -116.771940).

Demographics

2010 census
As of the census of 2010, there were 2,335 people, 883 households, and 689 families residing in the city. The racial makeup of the city was 96.8% White, 0.2% African American, 0.6% Native American, 0.4% Asian, 0.1% Pacific Islander, 0.6% from other races, and 1.3% from two or more races. Hispanic or Latino of any race were 3.2% of the population.

There were 883 households, of which 29.7% had children under the age of 18 living with them, 68.0% were married couples living together, 6.1% had a female householder with no husband present, 4.0% had a male householder with no wife present, and 22.0% were non-families. 17.7% of all households were made up of individuals, and 9.9% had someone living alone who was 65 years of age or older. The average household size was 2.64 and the average family size was 2.99.

The median age in the city was 48 years. 23.6% of residents were under the age of 18; 6.1% were between the ages of 18 and 24; 16.3% were from 25 to 44; 34.5% were from 45 to 64; and 19.4% were 65 years of age or older. The gender makeup of the city was 50.7% male and 49.3% female.

2000 census
As of the census of 2000, there were 2,278 people, 833 households, and 684 families residing in the city. The racial makeup of the city was 97.41% White, 0.04% African American, 0.53% Native American, 0.04% Asian, 0.13% Pacific Islander, 0.48% from other races, and 1.36% from two or more races. Hispanic or Latino of any race were 1.98% of the population.

There were 833 households, out of which 31.9% had children under the age of 18 living with them, 72.5% were married couples living together, 6.1% had a female householder with no husband present, and 17.8% were non-families. 15.4% of all households were made up of individuals, and 8.2% had someone living alone who was 65 years of age or older. The average household size was 2.73 and the average family size was 3.04.

In the city, the population was spread out, with 25.7% under the age of 18, 6.1% from 18 to 24, 21.7% from 25 to 44, 31.4% from 45 to 64, and 15.1% who were 65 years of age or older. The median age was 43 years. For every 100 females, there were 103.0 males. For every 100 females age 18 and over, there were 98.9 males.

The median income for a household in the city was $44,559, and the median income for a family was $47,083. Males had a median income of $41,696 versus $23,319 for females. The per capita income for the city was $21,521. About 3.3% of families and 3.4% of the population were below the poverty line, including 4.2% of those under age 18 and 1.3% of those age 65 or over.

See also

 List of cities in Idaho

References

External links

 

Cities in Idaho
Cities in Kootenai County, Idaho